Hidalgo may refer to:

People
 Hidalgo (nobility), members of the Spanish nobility
 Hidalgo (surname)

Places

Mexico
 Hidalgo (state), in central Mexico
 Hidalgo, Coahuila, a town in the north Mexican state of Coahuila
 Hidalgo, Nuevo León, a city in the state of Nuevo León
 Hidalgo, Tamaulipas, a municipality in the state of Tamaulipas
 Miguel Hidalgo, Mexico City, a borough of the Federal District
 Hidalgo Yalalag, Oaxaca
 Frontera Hidalgo, Chiapas
 Ciudad Hidalgo, Chiapas
 Ciudad Hidalgo, Michoacán
 Villa de Sabinas Hidalgo, Nuevo León
 Villa Hidalgo, Baja California
 Villa Hidalgo (Villaflores), Chiapas
 Villa Hidalgo (Tuzantán), Chiapas
 Villa Hidalgo, Coahuila
 Villa Hidalgo, Durango
 Villa Hidalgo, Jalisco
 Villa Hidalgo, Nayarit
 Villa Hidalgo, San Luis Potosí
 Villa Hidalgo, Sonora
 Villa Hidalgo, Tamaulipas
 Villa Hidalgo, Zacatecas
 Villa Hidalgo (Santa Rita), Zacatecas

United States
 Hidalgo, Illinois
 Hidalgo, Texas
 Hidalgo County, New Mexico
 Hidalgo County, Texas

Dominican Republic 
Los Hidalgos, Dominican Republic

Philippines 
Hidalgo Street, Qiapo, Manila, Philippines

Fiction
 Hidalgo, name of a fictional country in Central America in the Doc Savage stories

Transportation
 Hidalgo metro station, in Mexico City
 Hidalgo (Mexico City Metrobús, Line 3), a BRT station in Mexico City
 Hidalgo (Mexico City Metrobús, Line 4), a BRT station in Mexico City
 Hidalgo (Mexico City Metrobús, Line 7), a BRT station in Mexico City
 Hidalgo (Mexibús), a BRT station in Ecatepec, State of Mexico

Other uses
944 Hidalgo, an asteroid
 Hidalgo (film), a 2004 film based on the legend of the American distance rider Frank Hopkins and his mustang Hidalgo
 Hidalgo (moth), a moth genus
 Hidalgo (Sherry), a Spanish Sherry producer

See also

 
 
 Hidalgo County (disambiguation)